"Helpless When She Smiles" is the second single from American vocal group Backstreet Boys' sixth (fifth in the US) studio album, Unbreakable, which was released on October 30, 2007. The single, produced by John Shanks, was released on December 26, 2007. This song was leaked on the Internet back in May 2007 along with "Happily Never After" which never made the album.

The song was first released on the Album "Outragas" from the Dutch singer Bastiaan Ragas in 2005. Then a second time on the album "Absolute" from the german singer "Mike Leon Grosch" in the year 2006 before it was released by the Backstreet Boys.

Music video
The video for "Helpless When She Smiles" was in Joshua Tree National Park, California on November 13, 2007. It is directed by Bernard Gourley. The music video premiered on December 12 on Yahoo! Music. The video was filmed in color, but then stripped to appear black and white, depicting the group standing in a spacious corn field. It features helicopter shots, akin to previous Backstreet Boys video "More than That". The video peaked at #1 on Much More Music's Top 10 Countdown.

Track listing
UK CD1
 "Helpless When She Smiles" (album version) – 4:04
 "Helpless When She Smiles" (radio mix) – 4:04
 "Trouble Is" – 3:33

UK CD2
 "Helpless When She Smiles" (album version) – 4:04
 "Helpless When She Smiles" (radio mix) – 4:04
 "There's Us" – 4:10
 "Trouble Is" – 3:33
 "Nowhere to Go" – 2:48
 "Satellite" – 3:28

Digital download
 "Helpless When She Smiles" (radio mix) – 4:04
 "Helpless When She Smiles" (rock remix) – 4:02
 "Helpless When She Smiles" (Jason Nevins dub remix) – 7:09
 "Helpless When She Smiles" (Jason Nevins radio mix) – 4:24
 "Helpless When She Smiles" (Jason Nevins extended remix) – 7:38
 "Helpless When She Smiles" (Jason Nevins underground club remix) – 7:23

Charts

Release history

References

2007 songs
2008 singles
Backstreet Boys songs
Jive Records singles
Song recordings produced by John Shanks
Songs written by Aimee Mayo
Songs written by Brett James
Songs written by Chris Lindsey
Songs written by Troy Verges